Paul Jorge Burton Salvatierra (25 June 1992 – 11 December 2016) was a Bolivian footballer. Burton was left brain dead after a failed surgery for a herniated disc. He died a few days later, on 11 December 2016.

Career statistics

Notes

References

1992 births
2016 deaths
Bolivian footballers
Association football midfielders
Bolivian Primera División players
Municipal Real Mamoré players
Club San José players
Club Petrolero players
Oriente Petrolero players